The sodium-ion battery (NIB or SIB) is a type of rechargeable battery that uses sodium ions (Na+) as its charge carriers. Its working principle and cell construction are almost identical with those of lithium-ion battery (LIB) types, but replace lithium with sodium.
SIBs received academic and commercial interest in the 2010s and 2020s, largely due to the uneven geographic distribution, high environmental impact and high cost of many of the materials required for lithium-ion batteries. Chief among these are lithium, cobalt, copper and nickel, which are not strictly required for many types of sodium-ion batteries. The largest advantage of sodium-ion batteries is the natural abundance of sodium. Challenges to adoption of SIBs include low energy density and insufficient charge-discharge cycles.

As of 2022, sodium-ion batteries had not become commercially significant, but this might change as CATL, the world's biggest battery manufacturer, announced of starting mass production of SIBs in 2023. The technology is not mentioned in a United States Energy Information Administration report on battery storage technologies. Furthermore, no electric vehicles use sodium-ion batteries. In Februari 2023, the Chinese Hina placed a 120 Wh/kg sodium-ion battery in an electric test car for the first time.  Also in 2023 Energy storage manufactuer Pylontech obtained the first sodium-ion battery certificate by TÜV Rheinland.

History 
Sodium-ion battery development took place in the 1970s and early 1980s. However, by the 1990s, lithium-ion batteries had more demonstrated commercial promise, causing interest in sodium-ion batteries to decline. In the early 2010s, sodium-ion batteries experienced a resurgence, driven largely by the increasing cost of lithium-ion battery raw materials.

Operating principle 
SIB cells consist of a cathode based on a sodium containing material, an anode (not necessarily a sodium-based material) and a liquid electrolyte containing dissociated sodium salts in polar protic or aprotic solvents. During charging, sodium ions move from the cathode to the anode while electrons travel through the external circuit. During discharge, the reverse process occurs.

Materials 
Due to the physical and electrochemical properties of sodium, SIBs require other materials than those used for LIBs.

Anodes 
SIBs use hard carbon, a disordered carbon material consisting of a non-graphitizable, non-crystalline and amorphous carbon. Hard carbon's ability to absorb sodium was discovered in 2000. This anode was shown to deliver 300 mAh/g with a sloping potential profile above ⁓0.15 V vs Na/Na+. It accounts for roughly half of the capacity and a flat potential profile (a potential plateau) below ⁓0.15 V vs Na/Na+. Graphite anodes for LIBs offer typical capacities of 300–360 mAh/g. The first sodium-ion cell using hard carbon was demonstrated in 2003 and showed a 3.7 V average voltage during discharge. Hard carbon is preferred due to its excellent combination of capacity, (lower) working potentials and cycling stability.

In 2015 researchers demonstrated that graphite could co-intercalate sodium in ether-based electrolytes. Low capacities around 100 mAh/g were obtained with relatively high working potentials between 0 – 1.2 V vs Na/Na+. Some sodium titanate phases such as Na2Ti3O7, or NaTiO2, delivered capacities around 90–180 mAh/g at low working potentials (< 1 V vs Na/Na+), though cycling stability was limited to a few hundred cycles. Numerous reports described anode materials storing sodium via alloy reaction and/or conversion reaction. Alloying a sodium metal brings the benefits of regulating sodium-ion transport and shielding the accumulation of electric field at the tip of sodium dendrites. Wang, et al. reported that a self-regulating alloy interface of nickel antimony (NiSb) was chemically deposited on a Na metal during discharge. This thin layer of NiSb regulates the uniform electrochemical plating of Na metal, lowering overpotential and offering dendrite-free plating/stripping of Na metal over 100 h at a high areal capacity of 10 mAh cm−2.

In another study, Li et al. prepared sodium and metallic tin /Na through a spontaneous reaction. Despite sodium alloy's ability to operate at extreme temperatures and regulate dendritic growth, the severe stress-strain experienced on the material in the course of repeated storage cycles limits cycling stability, especially in large-format cells. Researchers from Tokyo University of Science achieved 478 mAh/g with nano‐sized magnesium particles, announced in December 2020.

In 2021 researchers from China tried layered structure  as a new type of anode for sodium-ion batteries. A dissolution-recrystallization process densely assembled carbon layer-coated MoS2 nanosheets onto the surface of polyimide-derived N-doped carbon nanotubes. This kind of C-MoS2/NCNTs anode can store 348 mAh/g at 2 A/g, with a cycling stability of 82% capacity after 400 cycles at 1 A/g. TiS2 is another potential material for SIBs because of its layered structure, but has yet to overcome the problem of capacity fade, since TiS2 suffers from poor electrochemical kinetics and relatively weak structural stability. In 2021 researchers from Ningbo, China employed pre-potassiated TiS2, presenting rate capability of 165.9mAh/g and a cycling stability of 85.3% capacity after 500 cycles.

Graphene Janus particles have been used in experimental sodium-ion batteries to increase energy density. One side provides interaction sites while the other provides inter-layer separation. Energy density reached 337 mAh/g.

Cathodes 
Sodium-ion cathodes store sodium via intercalation. Owing to their high tap density, high operating potentials and high capacities, cathodes based on sodium transition metal oxides have received the greatest attention. To keep costs low, research attempts to minimize costly elements such as Co, Cr, Ni or V. A P2-type Na2/3Fe1/2Mn1/2O2 oxide from earth-abundant Fe and Mn resources can reversibly store 190 mAh/g at average discharge voltage of 2.75 V vs Na/Na+ utilising the Fe3+/4+ redox couple – on par or better than commercial lithium-ion cathodes such as LiFePO4 or LiMn2O4. However, its sodium deficient nature lowered energy density. Significant efforts were expended in developing Na-richer oxides. A mixed P3/P2/O3-type Na0.76Mn0.5Ni0.3Fe0.1Mg0.1O2 was demonstrated to deliver 140 mAh/g at an average discharge voltage of 3.2 V vs Na/Na+ in 2015. In particular, the O3-type NaNi1/4Na1/6Mn2/12Ti4/12Sn1/12O2 oxide can deliver 160 mAh/g at average voltage of 3.22 V vs Na/Na+, while a series of doped Ni-based oxides of the stoichiometry NaaNi(1−x−y−z)MnxMgyTizO2 can deliver 157 mAh/g in a sodium-ion “full cell” with a hard carbon anode at average discharge voltage of 3.2 V utilising the Ni2+/4+ redox couple. Such performance in full cell configuration is better or on par with commercial lithium-ion systems. A Na0.67Mn1−xMgxO2 cathode material exhibited a discharge capacity of 175 mAh/g for Na0.67Mn0.95Mg0.05O2. This cathode contained only abundant elements. Copper-substituted Na0.67Ni0.3−xCuxMn0.7O2 cathode materials showed a high reversible capacity with better capacity retention. In contrast to the copper-free Na0.67Ni0.3−xCuxMn0.7O2 electrode, the as-prepared Cu-substituted cathodes deliver better sodium storage. However, cathodes with Cu are more expensive.

Research has also considered cathodes based on polyanions. Such cathodes offer lower tap density, lowering energy density on account of the bulky anion. This may be offset by the stronger covalent bonding of the polyanion that positively impacts cycle life and safety. Among polyanion-based cathodes, sodium vanadium phosphate and fluorophosphate have demonstrated excellent cycling stability and in the latter, an acceptably high capacity (⁓120 mAh/g) at high average discharge voltages (⁓3.6 V vs Na/Na+).

Several reports discussed the use of various Prussian blue and Prussian blue analogues (PBAs), with the patented rhombohedral Na2MnFe(CN)6 displaying 150–160 mAh/g in capacity and a 3.4 V average discharge voltage and rhombohedral Prussian white Na1.88(5)Fe[Fe(CN)6]·0.18(9)H2O displaying initial capacity of 158 mAh/g and retaining 90% capacity after 50 cycles.

Electrolytes 
Sodium-ion batteries can use aqueous and non-aqueous electrolytes. The limited electrochemical stability window of water results in lower voltages and limited energy densities. Non-aqueous carbonate ester polar aprotic solvents extend the voltage range. These include ethylene carbonate, dimethyl carbonate, diethyl carbonate, and propylene carbonate. The most widely used non-aqueous electrolyte uses sodium hexafluorophosphate as the salt dissolved in a mixture of these solvents. Additionally, electrolyte additives can improve performance metrics.

Comparison 
Sodium-ion batteries have several advantages over competing battery technologies. Compared to lithium-ion batteries, sodium-ion batteries have somewhat lower cost, slightly lower energy density, better safety characteristics, and similar power delivery characteristics.

The table below compares how NIBs in general fare against the two established rechargeable battery technologies in the market currently: the lithium-ion battery and the rechargeable lead–acid battery.

Commercialization 
Companies around the world have been working to develop commercially viable sodium-ion batteries.

Obsolete

Aquion Energy 
Aquion Energy was (between 2008 and 2017) a spin-off from Carnegie Mellon University. Their batteries were based on sodium titanium phosphate anode, manganese dioxide cathode, and sodium perchlorate electrolyte. After receiving government and private loans, the company filed for bankruptcy in 2017. Its assets were sold to a Chinese manufacturer Juline-Titans, who abandoned most of Aquion's patents.

Active

Faradion Limited 
Faradion Limited, is a subsidiary of India's Reliance Industries. Its cell design uses oxide cathodes with hard carbon anode and a liquid electrolyte. Their pouch cells have energy densities comparable to commercial Li-ion batteries (160 Wh/kg at cell-level) with good rate performance till 3C and cycle lives of 300 (100% depth of discharge) to over 1,000 cycles (80% depth of discharge). Its battery packs have demonstrated use for e-bike and e-scooter applications. They demonstrated transporting sodium-ion cells in the shorted state (at 0 V), eliminating risks from commercial transport of such cells. It is partnering with AMTE Power plc (formerly known as AGM Batteries Limited).

On December 5, 2022 Faradion installed its first natrium-ion battery for Nation in New South Wales Australia

TIAMAT 
TIAMAT spun off from the CNRS/CEA and a H2020 EU-project called NAIADES. Its technology focuses on the development of 18650-format cylindrical cells based on polyanionic materials. It achieved energy density between 100 Wh/kg to 120 Wh/kg. The technology targets applications in the fast charge and discharge markets. Power density is between 2 and 5 kW/kg, allowing for a 5 min charging time. Lifetime is 5000+ cycles to 80% of capacity.

HiNA Battery Technology Company 
HiNa Battery Technology Co., Ltd is, a spin-off from the Chinese Academy of Sciences (CAS). It leverages research conducted by Prof. Hu Yong-sheng's group at the Institute of Physics at CAS. HiNa's batteries are based on Na-Fe-Mn-Cu based oxide cathodes and anthracite-based carbon anode. In 2023, HiNa partnered with JAC as the first company to put a sodium-ion battery in an electric car, the Sehol E10X. HiNa also revealed three sodium-ion products, the NaCR32140-ME12 cylindrical cell, the NaCP50160118-ME80 square cell and the NaCP73174207-ME240 square cell, with gravimetric energy densities of 140 Wh/kg, 145 Wh/kg and 155 Wh/kg respectively.In 2019, it was reported that HiNa installed a 100 kWh sodium-ion battery power bank in East China.

Natron Energy 
Natron Energy, a spin-off from Stanford University, uses Prussian blue analogues for both cathode and anode with an aqueous electrolyte.

Altris AB 
Altris AB is a spin-off from the Ångström Advanced Battery Centre lead by Prof. Kristina Edström at Uppsala University. The company offers a proprietary iron-based Prussian blue analogue for the positive electrode in non-aqueous sodium-ion batteries that use hard carbon as the anode.

CATL 
Chinese battery manufacturer CATL announced in 2021 that it would bring a sodium-ion based battery to market by 2023.  It uses Prussian blue analogue for the positive electrode and porous carbon for the negative electrode. They claimed a specific energy density of 160 Wh/kg in their first generation battery. The company planned to produce a hybrid battery pack that includes both sodium-ion and lithium-ion cells.

See also 
 List of battery types
 Alkali metal-ion battery
 Lithium-ion battery
 Sodium-ion battery
 Potassium-ion battery
 Rechargeable battery
 Salt water battery

Notes

References

External links 
 

Metal-ion batteries
Battery types